Whyalla is a city in South Australia.

Whyalla may also refer to:

Places in South Australia
Whyalla Airport
Whyalla Conservation Park, a protected area
Whyalla High School, a high school
Whyalla railway line
Whyalla railway station, a former railway station
Whyalla Steelworks
City of Whyalla, a local government area
Electoral district of Whyalla, a former state electoral district

Ships
HMAS Whyalla
HMAS Whyalla (FCPB 208), a patrol boat
HMAS Whyalla (J153), a corvette

Organisations in South Australia
Whyalla Croatia, a soccer club 
Whyalla Football League, Australian rules football competition

See also